Skycar may refer to:
 Pitts Sky Car, an early (1928) attempt at vertical take-off flight by US inventor John W. Pitts.
 Stout Skycar, a series of four one-off light aircraft designed by William Bushnell Stout in the 1930s.
 Moller Skycar M400 a prototype American flying car
 OMA SUD Skycar an Italian four-seat piston engined aircraft
 Parajet Skycar a British parafoil dune buggy

See also 

 Flying car (disambiguation)
 Aerocar (disambiguation)